The kidney bean is a variety of the common bean (Phaseolus vulgaris). It resembles a human kidney and thus is named after such. Red kidney beans should not be confused with other red beans, such as adzuki beans.

Classification
There are different classifications of kidney beans, such as:

Red kidney bean (also known as: common kidney bean, rajma in India, surkh (red) lobia in Pakistan).
Light speckled kidney bean (and long shape light speckled kidney bean).
Red speckled kidney bean (and long shape light speckled kidney bean).
White kidney bean (also known as cannellini in Italy, lobia in India, or safaid (white) lobia in Pakistan).

Nutrition
Kidney beans, cooked by boiling, are 67% water, 23% carbohydrates, 9% protein, and contain negligible fat (table). In a 100-gram reference amount, cooked kidney beans provide  of food energy, and are a rich source (20% or more of the Daily Value, DV) of protein, folate (33% DV), iron (22% DV), and phosphorus (20% DV), with moderate amounts (10–19% DV) of thiamine, copper, magnesium, and zinc (11–14% DV).

Dishes

Red kidney beans are commonly used in chili con carne and are used in the cuisine of India, where the beans are known as rajma. Red kidney beans are used in southern Louisiana for the classic Monday Creole dish of red beans and rice. The smaller, darker red beans are also used, particularly in Louisiana families with a recent Caribbean heritage. In Jamaica, they are referred to as red peas. Small kidney beans used in La Rioja, Spain, are called caparrones. In the Netherlands and Indonesia, kidney beans are usually served as soup called brenebon. In the Levant, a common dish consisting of kidney bean stew usually served with rice is known as fasoulia. To make bean paste, kidney beans are generally prepared from dried beans and boiling until they are soft, at which point the dark red beans are pulverized into a dry paste.

Toxicity

Red kidney beans contain relatively high amounts of phytohemagglutinin, and thus are more toxic than most other bean varieties if not pre-soaked and subsequently heated to the boiling point for at least 10 minutes. The US Food and Drug Administration recommends boiling for 30 minutes to ensure they reach a sufficient temperature long enough to completely destroy the toxin. Canned red kidney beans, though, are safe to eat straight from the can, as they are cooked prior to being shipped. As few as five raw beans or a single undercooked kidney bean can cause severe nausea, diarrhea, vomiting, and abdominal pains.

References

Phaseolus
Edible legumes